Barry Thomas Crowe (born 11 January 2002), known as Barry Baggley, is a Northern Irish professional footballer who plays as a midfielder for League of Ireland First Division side Waterford, on loan from League One club Fleetwood Town.

Early and personal life
Baggley is from the Turf Lodge area of Belfast. His father Barry Snr is an amateur football manager.

Club career
Baggley began his career at Linfield and Glentoran, moving to English club Fleetwood Town in September 2018 following two trial periods. After initially playing for their youth team, he made his senior debut on 9 March 2019, appearing as a late substitute in a 2–0 league defeat away at Walsall. In doing so he became Fleetwood's youngest ever league player, at the age of 17 years and 57 days. He was later praised by manager Joey Barton.

In July 2021 he signed a new three-year contract with Fleetwood. On 26 October 2021, Baggley joined National League side Altrincham on loan for one month. He scored on his debut for Altrincham against Solihull Moors, and returned to Fleetwood in November 2021 having made a further two appearances during the loan spell.

In January 2023, he was loaned out to Fleetwood's sister club Waterford for a season long loan until the end of their League of Ireland First Division campaign in November.

International career
Baggley has represented Northern Ireland at youth level.

Career statistics

References

2002 births
Living people
Association footballers from Belfast
Association footballers from Northern Ireland
Northern Ireland youth international footballers
Association football midfielders
Glentoran F.C. players
Fleetwood Town F.C. players
Altrincham F.C. players
English Football League players
National League (English football) players
Linfield F.C. players
Waterford F.C. players
League of Ireland players